Marwan Hamdy Mehany Abdelhamid (born 15 November 1996) is an Egyptian professional footballer who plays as a striker for Egyptian Premier League club Al masry and the Egypt national team.

International career
He made his debut for the Egypt national football team in the 2021 Africa Cup of Nations qualification against Comoros away on 18 November 2019.

International goals

Honours

. Egyptian Premier League: 2020–2021

References

External links

Living people
1996 births
Egyptian footballers
Egypt international footballers
Egyptian Premier League players
Association football forwards
Misr Lel Makkasa SC players
Wadi Degla SC players
2021 Africa Cup of Nations players